Rudbeckia hirta, commonly called black-eyed Susan, is a North American flowering plant in the family Asteraceae, native to Eastern and Central North America and naturalized in the Western part of the continent as well as in China. It has now been found in all 10 Canadian Provinces and all 48 of the states in the contiguous United States. 

Rudbeckia hirta is the state flower of Maryland.

Description
It has alternate, mostly basal leaves 10–18 cm long, covered by coarse hair, with stout branching stems and daisy-like, composite flower heads appearing in late summer and early autumn. However, extensive breeding has produced a range of sizes and colours, including oranges, reds and browns.

Etymology and common names
The specific epithet hirta is Latin for “hairy”, and refers to the trichomes occurring on leaves and stems. Other common names for this plant include: brown-eyed Susan, brown betty, gloriosa daisy, golden Jerusalem, English bull's eye, poor-land daisy, yellow daisy, and yellow ox-eye daisy.

Varieties
There are four varieties
Rudbeckia hirta var. angustifolia - southeastern + south-central United States (South Carolina to Texas)
Rudbeckia hirta var. floridana - Florida
Rudbeckia hirta var. hirta - Eastern United States (Maine to Alabama).
Rudbeckia hirta var. pulcherrima - Widespread in most of North America (Newfoundland to British Columbia, south to Alabama and New Mexico; naturalized Washington to California).

Cultivation
Rudbeckia hirta is widely cultivated in parks and gardens, for summer bedding schemes, borders, containers, wildflower gardens, prairie-style plantings and cut flowers. Numerous cultivars have been developed, of which 'Indian Summer' and 'Toto' have gained the Royal Horticultural Society's Award of Garden Merit. Other popular cultivars include 'Double Gold' and 'Marmalade'.

Gloriosa daisies are tetraploid cultivars having much larger flower heads than the wild species, often doubled or with contrasting markings on the ray florets. They were first bred by Alfred Blakeslee of Smith College by applying colchicine to R. hirta seeds; Blakeslee's stock was further developed by W. Atlee Burpee and introduced to commerce at the 1957 Philadelphia Flower Show. Gloriosa daisies are generally treated as annuals or short-lived perennials and are typically grown from seed, though there are some named cultivars.

Symbolism and uses

Maryland state flower

The black-eyed Susan was designated the state flower of Maryland in 1918. In this capacity it is used in gardens and ceremonies to celebrate, memorialize and show affection for the state of Maryland and its people. The Preakness Stakes in Baltimore, Maryland, has been termed "The Run for the Black-Eyed Susans" because a blanket of Viking Poms, a variety of chrysanthemums resembling black-eyed Susans, is traditionally placed around the winning horse's neck (actual black-eyed Susans are not in bloom in May during the Preakness).

University of Southern Mississippi
In 1912, the black-eyed Susan became the inspiration for the University of Southern Mississippi school colors (black and gold), suggested by Florence Burrow Pope, a member of the university's first graduating class. According to Pope: “On a trip home, I saw great masses of Black-Eyed Susans in the pine forests. I decided to encourage my senior class to gather Black-Eyed Susans to spell out the name of the class on sheets to be displayed during exercises on Class Day. I then suggested black and gold as class colors, and my suggestion was adopted."

Butterfly attractant for enhancing gardens
Butterflies are attracted to Rudbeckia hirta. It is a larval host to the bordered patch, gorgone checkerspot, and silvery checkerspot species.

Traditional Native American uses
The plant is thought to be an herbal medicine by Native American for various ailments. The roots but not the seedheads of Rudbeckia hirta can be used much like the related Echinacea purpurea with unsubstantiated claims to boost immunity and fight colds, flu and infections. The Ojibwa people used it as a poultice for snake bites and to make an infusion for treating colds and worms in children.

Cautions
The species is toxic to cats when ingested.

Gallery

References

External links

Knowlton Foote. 2001. Black-eyed Susan (Rudbeckia hirta L.). New York Flora Association. Newsletter Vol. 13.
Florida Native Plant Society: Rudbeckia Hirta  

Butterfly food plants
Flora of North America
Plants described in 1753
Plants used in traditional Native American medicine
hirta
Symbols of Maryland
Taxa named by Carl Linnaeus